Witchcraft II: The Temptress is a 1990 American horror film directed by Mark Woods and starring Charles Solomon, Delia Sheppard, David Homb, Mia M. Ruiz, Jay Richardson, Cheryl Janecky, Mary Shelley, and Frank Woods. The screenplay was written by Jim Hanson and Sal Manna. The film is a sequel to the 1988 direct-to-video film Witchcraft, and the second film in the Witchcraft series. It is followed by Witchcraft III: The Kiss of Death.

Plot 

About 18 years after the first film's ending, William Adams is living with his adopted parents and assumes he is a normal 18 year old. He is unaware of his adoption. Williams's adoptive parents stole him away from the coven in the previous film, as they are white witches who did not agree with the  aims of their coven.  They have hidden William in the suburbs to protect him from evil.

His neighbor Deloris leaves William a strange object in an attempt to get William to join the dark side.

Unknown to William, he is the son of a powerful warlock and has inherited his father's powers. The father and many of his paternal relatives are members of a coven who have spent years attempting to bring about the end of the world. Deloris's ultimate goal is to and have William father her child, who will bring about hell on earth. At the last possible moment, Spanner is able to defeat the witch and resist evil

Cast
 Charles Solomon as William Spanner
 Mia Ruiz as Michelle
 Delia Sheppard as Deloris Jones
 David L. Homb as Boomer
 Kirsten Wagner as Audrey
 Cheryl Janecky as William's mom

Reception

TV Guide found that while both Ruiz and Janecky are visibly talented actors, the film was lacking, garnering only 1 out of 5 stars  In Creature Feature, the film was given two out of five stars, stating that it intends to be deadly serious, but comes across as unintentionally funny.

Production 
The film cost $80,000 to make and wound up making over one million dollars for the distributors.

The film contains a notice that "This movie is not intended as an accurate portrayal of true witches".

Home media
The film was released on video in May 1990 and re-released on DVD format on October 22, 1997.

References

External links 
 
 

1990 films
1990 horror films
American horror films
1990s English-language films
Films about witchcraft
American sequel films
1990s American films